Yoo Won-chul (born 20 July 1984) is a South Korean gymnast. Yoo was part of the South Korean team that won the bronze medal in the team event at the 2006 Asian Games. As an individual, he won a silver medal at the 2006 World Artistic Gymnastics Championships in the parallel bars and a silver medal in the parallel bars at the 2008 Summer Olympic games.

Education
 Korea National Sport University

References

External links
 
 

1984 births
Living people
South Korean male artistic gymnasts
Olympic gymnasts of South Korea
Gymnasts at the 2008 Summer Olympics
Gymnasts at the 2016 Summer Olympics
Olympic silver medalists for South Korea
Medalists at the World Artistic Gymnastics Championships
Place of birth missing (living people)
Olympic medalists in gymnastics
Medalists at the 2008 Summer Olympics
Asian Games medalists in gymnastics
Gymnasts at the 2006 Asian Games
Gymnasts at the 2010 Asian Games
Korea National Sport University alumni
Asian Games bronze medalists for South Korea
Medalists at the 2006 Asian Games
Medalists at the 2010 Asian Games
South Korean Buddhists
21st-century South Korean people